John Custis III (1654 – January 26, 1714) was an American planter and politician, who served in both houses of the Virginia General Assembly in the British colony of Virginia, as well as in various local offices on the Eastern Shore of Virginia in Northampton County. He is sometimes designated John Custis III or "of Wilsonia" to distinguish him from his son (John Custis IV or "of Williamsburg", as well as father and grandfather, all of the same name.

Early life
Custis was born in late 1653 or early 1654 in Northampton County, Virginia, to British merchant and eventual emigrant John Custis II and his first wife, Elizabeth Robinson, who died shortly after the birth. His father, in addition to farming, held various local offices and eventually won appointment to the Governor's Council and remarried twice more. John Custis III was raised mostly at the mansion his father built and called Arlington plantation, which he had purchased from Thomas Burdett, whose daughter Alicia became his second wife (but died probably in 1680). When John III was a child, his father not only became one of the judges on the Northampton County Court, and the county's sheriff in 1665, in 1676 Arlington became the temporary capital and residence for Virginia's Governor Berkeley during Bacon's Rebellion, which may have facilitated the elder Custis' promotion to the Governor's Council the following year. John Custis II also would marry a third time, to the widow Tabitha Scarborurgh Smart Brown, whose daughter from a previous marriage married John Custis II's nephew before property disagreements arose between John II and Tabitha. The elder John Custis died and was buried at Arlington in 1696, and his widow married Edward Hill, who had been the colony's treasurer.

Meanwhile, young John Custis III received a private education appropriate to his class from tutors. He married twice. His first wife, Margaret Michael, bore him seven sons and two daughters, but died following her second daughter's birth. In 1691, Custis married her brother's widow, but Sarah Littleton Michael bore no further children. John Custis IV as the eldest son by primogeniture received most of his father's significant estate.

Career

Custis was a planter, who grew tobacco using enslaved labor. He mostly resided on his Wilsonia plantation, which is now Machipongo, Virginia Custis often appears as an attorney in early Northampton County records, including successfully representing the rector in Teackle v. Parker late in the century. He also invested in real estate to the northern boundary of Virginia's Eastern shore, near Chincoteague Island, often with fellow planter and politician William Kendall as partner. In 1705, a court found his slave Sarah guilty for burning a barn full of grain and several barrels of Her Majesty's gunpowder, and was hanged, although Custis was not ordered to compensate the government for the destroyed gunpowder.

This John Custis at various times hold most of the public offices in Northampton County, which was created in 1663 when the Virginia General Assembly split Accomack County. His father John Custis II became the county's coroner in 1673, and two years later appointed his son as his deputy, to conduct the office in his absence. When his father received an appointment to the Governor's Council in 1677, his position as justice of the county court (which held administrative as well as judicial functions) went to John Custis III. Like his father, John Custis III also won election three times as the county sheriff (in 1682, 1684, and 1688), so his father was responsible for imprisoning some of Nathaniel Bacon's followers in 1676. In 1683 this John Custis summoned the churchwardens of Hunger's Parish to the General Court in Williamsburg on parishioners' behalf, for moving the church without the parish's consent, as well as continuing their terms without re-election. He would first serve on the parish's vestry in 1691.

Northampton County voters elected John Custis III as one of their two delegates in the House of Burgesses in 1684, and he served many terms in the lower house of the Virginia General Assembly until appointed to the Governor's Council in late 1699 (remaining in the upper house for the rest of his life, as was customary). Although Custis III was disqualified for his first term because he simultaneously held the county office of sheriff, when the election was held again, he won again, so served alongside Isaac Foxcroft in the 1685-1686 session. He next won election in 1693, when he and William Kendall represented the county; voters replaced Kendall by William Waters in the year's second session, and both Custis and Waters won re-election until 1697, when Waters was elected sheriff. Meanwhile, Custis' political influence grew in the colony, as he came to chair the House of Burgess' Committee for Elections and Privileges, and also held a high-ranking seat on the Committee for Propositions and Grievances, although possibly his most important service was chairing the committee that recommended moving the colony's capitol to Middle Planation, which became Williamsburg. During his final terms in the lower house, Custis represented Northampton County together with Nathaniel Littleton; in 1699, partly because of Custis' promotion to the Governor's Council, both were replaced by William Waters and John Powell. Custis' royal appointment to the governor's Council was signed on December 26, 1699, the King accepting the recommendation of Governor Francis Nicholson. John Custis III began serving in the upper house of the Virginia General Assembly on July 19, 1700, and held that office until his death, although his last recorded appearance was on April 30, 1713. Meanwhile, his son John Custis IV began representing Northampton County in the House of Burgesses in 1705.

Death

John Custis III suffered ill health, including gout and arthritis, during his final years. He wrote his will in 1708, by which time he owned over 7,000 acres of land and 30 slaves. He died at his Wilsonia plantation on January 26, 1714, and was buried there. Arlington burned to the ground during his son's tenure, and while major signage indicates only John Custis II and John Custis IV are buried at the Arlington plantation's Custis Tombs, a smaller sign indicates Custis III was also reburied there.

References

1654 births
1714 deaths
American planters
British North American Anglicans
Custis family of Virginia
People from Northampton County, Virginia
Virginia Governor's Council members
American slave owners